The 700th Anniversary of Chiang Mai Stadium is a multi-purpose stadium in Chiang Mai, Chiang Mai Province, Thailand, built to host the 1995 Southeast Asian Games and to commemorate the 700th anniversary of Chiang Mai's establishment at the same time. It was also used for the 1998 Asian Games. Football side Chiangmai F.C. returned to the stadium for the 2009 season, having used a municipal stadium elsewhere in the city in recent years.

Navamin Reservoir (อ่างเก็บน้ำนวมินทร์), also known as Mae Jok Luang Reservoir (อ่างเก็บน้ำแม่จอกหลวง), is located directly behind the stadium.

Architecture
Architecturally, the stadium is clearly a forebear of the 80th Birthday Stadium in Nakhon Ratchasima. A continuous single tier, almost a perfect circle, rises up on one side to form a large main stand which provides covered accommodation for 4,500 spectators. Only the main stand has plastic seats and a cover. The rest of the tribunes are uncovered concrete steps painted white.

References

External links 
 700th Anniversary Stadium on fifa.com

Football venues in Thailand
Multi-purpose stadiums in Thailand
Sport in Chiang Mai
Buildings and structures in Chiang Mai
Sports venues completed in 1995
1995 establishments in Thailand
Chiangmai F.C.
1990s in Chiang Mai
Southeast Asian Games stadiums
Southeast Asian Games athletics venues
Southeast Asian Games football venues